Toei Animation Inc. (abbreviated as TAI, or sometimes just Toei Animation USA or Toei LATAM depending on the territory) is an American licensing and distributor based in Los Angeles. It is Toei Animation's American sister company. It holds partnerships with TV channels, DVD distributors, and streaming websites.

History
Due to Toei Animation's decision to start distributing the series directly since 2003 with the establishment of Toei Animation Europe based in Paris, Toei Animation Inc. based in Los Angeles was founded in 2004.

In 2005, the Toei Animation licenses that were distributed by Cloverway Inc. were transferred to Toei Animation Inc. for requirement, leaving Cloverway alone with the licenses of the other Japanese producers with which it intermediated until August 2007 (due to economic problems). As a consequence of this, there has been a chain of irregularities, such as the loss of master tapes of many series, with the Latin American versions being the most affected for this change in distribution.

Anime

Distributor
 Air Gear (sub-distributed by Funimation (later Crunchyroll) for U.S.)
 Dragon Ball franchise (distributed directly for Latin America since 2005 and sub-distributed by Funimation (later Crunchyroll) for U.S.)
 Digimon franchise (distributed directly for Latin America since 2005 and distributed directly for U.S. since 2017 originally distributed by Saban Entertainment, BVS Entertainment and Saban Brands. The first season of the franchise is currently sub-distributed by Discotek Media in the U.S.)  
 Dr. Slump (distributed directly for Latin America since 2005)
 GeGeGe no Kitaro franchise
 1996's series (distributed directly for Latin America since 2005)
 2018's series
 Magical Doremi franchise (distributed directly for Latin America since 2005)
 Mazinger Z (distributed directly for Latin America since 2012)
 Ghost Sweeper Mikami (distributed directly for Latin America since 2005)
 Hell Teacher Nūbē (distributed directly for Latin America since 2005)
 Ashita no Nadja (distributed directly for Latin America since 2005)
 One Piece (4Kids version, distributed directly for Latin America and sub-distributed by Funimation (later Crunchyroll) for U.S.)
 Pretty Cure franchise
 Futari wa Pretty Cure (distributed directly for Latin America since 2008)
 Glitter Force (distributed directly for Latin America and U.S. since 2017)
 Glitter Force Doki Doki (sub-distributed by Saban Brands (later Entertainment One) for U.S. and Latin America)
 Saint Seiya franchise (distributed directly for Latin America since 2005)
 Sailor Moon franchise (distributed directly for Latin America since 2005 and sub-distributed by Viz Media for U.S. since 2014)
 Sailor Moon Crystal (distributed directly for Latin America since 2017 and sub-distributed by Viz Media for U.S.)
 Slam Dunk (distributed directly for Latin America since 2005)
 Toriko (distributed directly for Latin America since 2012 and sub-distributed by Funimation (later Crunchyroll) for U.S.)
 World Trigger

Original productions
 Knights of the Zodiac: Saint Seiya (2019)

References

External links
 
 Official Toei Animation Inc. YouTube channel
 Old Toei Animation Inc. official website (archive)
 
 

2004 establishments in California
American companies established in 2004
American subsidiaries of foreign companies
Anime companies
Companies based in Los Angeles
Entertainment companies based in California
Entertainment companies established in 2004